Albanchez de Mágina Castle is a Spanish fortification and Bien de Interés Cultural landmark in the Province of Jaén. While the exact date of construction is not known, some authors (Cerezo and Eslava) speculate it could date to the 14th century.

References

Bibliography
Ministerio de Cultura, Patrimonio Histórico
Cerezo Moreno, Francisco; Eslava Galán, Juan (1989). Riquelme y Vargas, ed. Castillos y atalayas del Reino de Jaén.
Olivares Barragán, Francisco (1992). Excma. Diputación Provincial. Instituto de Estudios Giennenses, ed. Castillo de la provincia de Jaén. pp. 35–45.
López Pegalajar, Manuel (1994). Excma. Diputación Provincial. Instituto de Estudios Giennenses, ed. Aproximación al Patrimonio Monumental de Sierra Mágina: Castillos, Iglesias y Palacios.
Salvatierra Cuenca, Vicente (1998). Albanchez de Úbeda: Villa fortificada. pp. 91–93.
Salvatierra Cuenca, Vicente; Castillo Armenteros, Juan Carlos (1997). Castillo de Albanchez. p. 159.

Bien de Interés Cultural landmarks in the Province of Jaén (Spain)
Buildings and structures completed in the 14th century
Castles in Andalusia